The mineral-mining industry of Panama accounted for about 1% of the country's GDP in 2006. This does not include any manufacturing of mineral commodities, such as cement or petroleum refinery products.

Production and exploration
The only metallic mine operating in Panama is Petaquilla Minerals Molejon epithermal gold deposit on the Ley 9, 1997  property in Panama in Colón Province. The mine has the capacity to produce 100,000 oz/yr. The Cobre Panama (ex Petaquilla) copper project is run by Minera Panama S.A. and owned by First Quantum and is under study to produce approximately 270,000 tpy of copper. 

Minera Petaquilla S.A. was a joint venture between Petaquilla Minerals Ltd. of Canada (52%) and Inmet Mining Corp., also of Canada (48%). Minera Petaquilla was formed in 1997 to explore and develop the Cerro Petaquilla copper-gold porphyry deposit and other metallic mineral deposits within the Ley Petaquilla property, which is a large concession area that extends south from the Caribbean coast approximately 100 kilometers west of the Panama Canal. Teck Cominco Ltd. of Canada had an option contract to earn a 50% ownership share in Petaquilla Minerals (26% share in Minera Petaquilla) if it continued to fund all Petaquilla Minerals’ share (52%) of the exploration and development costs of the Cerro Petaquilla copper project; Inmet was expected to fund the other 48% of total expenditures in the project. By the end of 2006, however, Inmet and Petaquilla Minerals continued to agree to extend Teck Cominco’s option until production is achieved or until all three companies agree to terminate the project, and almost no investment was made in the copper project during the year. The new deadline for a commitment by Teck Cominco was set to expire on March 30, 2008.

Global Energy Development PLC (Harken Energy Corp. of Southlake, Texas, 34%, and other private shareholders, 66%) of the United Kingdom was still negotiating exploration contracts with the Ministry of Commerce and Industry of the Republic of Panama through the end of 2006.

Petaquilla Minerals acquired 100% ownership of the Molejon epithermal gold deposit on the Ley Petaquilla property in Panama, where the company focused almost all its investment during the year through its new gold-properties subsidiary, Petaquilla Gold S.A. Inmet and Teck Cominco retained only royalty rights (at rates to be determined) on any eventual production from gold deposits located within the Ley Petaquilla property. By sometime in 2008, Petaquilla Minerals expected to achieve the company’s first production of gold at Molejon.

Production of aggregate mineral materials, cement, and other construction materials was expected to have increased in 2006 compared with that of 2005. This was mainly because of public approval on October 22, 2006, for expansion of the Panama Canal to start sometime during the second half of 2007. This construction project was expected to be large enough that mineral companies in the construction materials sector in Panama, other countries of Central America, and in nearby Colombia would be ramping up production and securing contracts with the Panama Canal Authority to supply mineral-based materials for the canal expansion.

The very large Cerro Colorado project is owned by the government. Other exploration targets are Cerro Quema (gold) and Cerro Chorcha (copper).

With Cobre Panama, Cerro Colorado and Cerro Chorcha, Panama has one of the highest concentrations of copper per unit area in the world.

International agreements 
Panama is part of the San José Pact, which allows the country to receive crude petroleum under preferential terms and pricing from Mexico and Venezuela. Venezuela also provides additional shipments of crude petroleum to Panama according to the terms of the Caracas Energy Accord. Panama is not part of CAFTATA-DR and was still negotiating a separate bilateral free trade agreement with the United States through the end of 2006.

References

Mining in Panama